We're Here to the End is the first full-length live album by the rock band Therapy? and the second album to be released on Blast Records, part of The Global Music Group family. It was released on 8 November 2010.

The album was recorded on 29, 30, 31 March 2010 at Monto Water Rats in London and mixed in May 2010 at Blast Studios in Newcastle.

Produced by Adam Sinclair and Andy Cairns, the album is a two-CD release featuring 36 tracks culled from all three nights of the London residency.

A total of 40 different songs were played across the three nights. The recordings of two songs, "Lonely, Cryin' Only" and "I Am the Money", were quickly discarded by the band due to performance quality. Two other songs, "Ten Year Plan" and "I Told You I Was Ill", were dropped due to technical issues with the recordings.

Track listing

CD1

CD2

Personnel 
Therapy?
Andy Cairns – vocals, guitar, mixing
Neil Cooper – drums
Michael McKeegan – bass, vocals
Technical
Adam Sinclair – mixing
John Walsh – live sound
Richard Baker – live mix consultant
Marc Suski – artwork
Jon Lawless – live photography

References

External links 
 

2010 albums
Therapy? albums